Barter Books is a second-hand bookshop in the historic English market town of Alnwick, Northumberland, owned and run by Stuart and Mary Manley. It has over 350,000 visitors a year, 40% of whom are from outside the area, and is one of the largest second-hand bookshops in Europe.  It is considered a local tourist attraction and has been described as "the British Library of second-hand bookshops."

The bookshop is in the Victorian Alnwick railway station, designed by William Bell and opened in 1887. The station was in use until the closure of the Alnwick branch line in 1968; Barter Books was opened in 1991.

The shop is notable for its use of a barter system, whereby customers can exchange their books for credit against future purchases; standard cash purchases are also available.

Barter Books has also been subject to crime on occasion.  On 3 May 2007 a local newspaper, the Northumberland Gazette, reported that a book worth over £2,000 was returned to the book shop 5 years after it was stolen.

Barter Books hit the headlines in 2000 when the owner discovered, in a box of old books bought at an auction, a World War II poster from 1939.  The slogan, "Keep Calm and Carry On", and the simple design have turned it into an international phenomenon; and it has been on the walls of places as diverse as Buckingham Palace, 10 Downing Street and the US Embassy in Belgium.

See also 
 Book trade in the United Kingdom

References

External links 

 

Alnwick
Bookshops of England
Bookstores established in the 20th century